Kursky Uyezd (Ку́рский уе́зд) was one of the subdivisions of the Kursk Governorate of the Russian Empire. It was situated in the central part of the governorate. Its administrative centre was Kursk.

Demographics
At the time of the Russian Empire Census of 1897, Kursky Uyezd had a population of 222,808. Of these, 97.2% spoke Russian, 1.0% Ukrainian, 0.7% Yiddish, 0.6% Polish, 0.2% German and 0.1% Tatar as their native language.

References

 
Uezds of Kursk Governorate
Kursk Governorate